TerraNet or Terranet may refer to:
TerraNet AB, a Swedish technology company designing peer-to-peer wireless technology
Terranet ISP, an Internet Service Provider in Lebanon
Terranet SRL, a Website Design and Development in Moldova
Terranet, an internet-based land and property information service from Terralink International Ltd in New Zealand
Teranet, a Canadian provider of land registry services for the Province of Ontario and other related services